In algebra, an operad algebra is an "algebra" over an operad. It is a generalization of an associative algebra over a commutative ring R, with an operad replacing R.

Definitions 
Given an operad O (say, a symmetric sequence in a symmetric monoidal ∞-category C), an algebra over an operad, or O-algebra''' for short, is, roughly, a left module over O with multiplications parametrized by O.

If O is a topological operad, then one can say an algebra over an operad is an O-monoid object in C. If C is symmetric monoidal, this recovers the usual definition.

Let C be symmetric monoidal ∞-category with monoidal structure distributive over colimits. If  is a map of operads and, moreover, if f is a homotopy equivalence, then the ∞-category of algebras over O in C is equivalent to the ∞-category of algebras over O in C''.

See also 
En-ring
Homotopy Lie algebra

Notes

References

External links 
http://ncatlab.org/nlab/show/operad
http://ncatlab.org/nlab/show/algebra+over+an+operad

Abstract algebra